Bryconamericus lethostigmus is a species of characin endemic to Brazil, where it is found in the basins of the Maquiné, Tres Forquilhas and Mapituba Rivers.

References

Characidae
Fish of South America
Fish of Brazil
Endemic fauna of Brazil
Fish described in 1947